The sixteenth government of Israel was formed by Golda Meir on 10 March 1974, following the December 1973 elections. However, following Meir's resignation as Prime Minister on 11 April, it only remained in office until 3 June, and at just 85 days, was the shortest-lived government in Israeli political history.

Meir's coalition consisted of only three parties; the Alignment, the National Religious Party and the Independent Liberals, although the two Israeli Arab Alignment-affiliated parties (Progress and Development and the Arab List for Bedouins and Villagers) had merged into the Alignment following the election, and held 68 of the 120 seats in the Knesset. The government initially had 22 ministers, although Minister of Welfare Michael Hasani resigned on 4 April and was not replaced. Nine of the ministers were non-Knesset members, although two of them (both from the Independent Liberals) had been elected to the Knesset in the recent election, but resigned after being appointed to the cabinet. Unlike the previous government, in which there were nine deputy ministerial portfolios, the sixteenth government had only one deputy minister, who was not appointed until 6 May.

Despite her government being praised for its administration, Meir resigned on 11 April 1974 after the Agranat Commission had published its interim report on the Yom Kippur War. The government remained in office whilst the Labor Party (the largest faction within the Alignment) elected a new leader who would attempt to form a new government. On 26 April Yitzhak Rabin, then Minister of Labour, defeated Shimon Peres, the Minister of Information, in the party's leadership contest. Rabin went on to form the seventeenth government on 3 June 1974.

Cabinet members

1 Although Gvati, Rosen, Shem-Tov and Uzan were not members of the Knesset at the time, they had previously been MKs for the Alignment.

2 Although Bar-Lev and Rabinovitz were not MKs at the time, they were later elected to the Knesset on the Alignment list.

3 Kol and Hausner had been elected to the Knesset on the Independent Liberals list, but resigned their seats after being appointed to the cabinet.

References

External links
Eighth Knesset: Government 16 Knesset website

 16
1974 establishments in Israel
1974 disestablishments in Israel
Cabinets established in 1974
Cabinets disestablished in 1974
1974 in Israeli politics
 16
Golda Meir